PETROU\Man is an American fashion label with European aesthetics and ethnic influences. Headed by fashion designer and couturier, Nicolas Petrou, the label is sold in upscale fashion stores across the globe.

The Label
Drawing on varied inspirations, from illustrations by the Japanese artists Sirichai to tribal and ethnic art, the upscale menswear label offers unique yet comfortable clothing. The debut collection, which included masked skins with colorful patterns created media buzz and led to a collaboration with Henrik Vibskov for the cover of Dazed & Confused. PETROU\MAN is known for combining the comfort of sportswear with the elegance and timelessness of tailored high-end menswear and with a special focus on textures and color. With tribal and ethnic influences from Guatemala to West Africa, the label has been hailed "as a beacon for alternative menswear".

Stores
The collection is available at stores worldwide, such OAK in New York, I.T. and Joyce in Hong Kong, and SHIPS in Japan.  The collection is also available at MACHINE-A in London

References
Notes

External links

Clothing brands of the United States
Clothing companies based in New York City
High fashion brands